Claudio Nicolás Bravo (born 13 March 1997) is an Argentine professional footballer who plays as a left-back for Major League Soccer club Portland Timbers.

Club career
After starting out at a local team in Villa Rita, Lomas de Zamora, Bravo later joined the academy of Banfield; having previously had trials with Vélez Sarsfield, Lanús and Los Andes. At senior level, he was an unused substitute once during the 2016 Primera División season, which preceded his professional debut arriving on 24 September 2017 as Banfield put four unanswered goals past Rosario Central away from home. Eight further appearances followed in 2017–18. He featured in continental football for the first time in July 2018, playing the full duration of a second stage first leg loss to Boston River. He was sent off in his last match for the club on 4 December 2020 versus Rosario Central.

Portland Timbers
On 17 December 2020, Bravo joined Major League Soccer club Portland Timbers for an undisclosed fee.

International career
In November 2015, Bravo was selected to train with the Argentina U20s under manager Humberto Grondona. September 2019 saw Bravo receive a call-up to the U23s for a friendly with Bolivia. For the latter, Bravo appeared six times at the 2020 CONMEBOL Pre-Olympic Tournament; which they won.

Career statistics
.

Honours
Argentina U23
 Pre-Olympic Tournament: 2020

Notes

References

External links

1997 births
Living people
People from Lomas de Zamora
Argentine footballers
Argentina youth international footballers
Association football defenders
Argentine expatriate footballers
Expatriate soccer players in the United States
Argentine expatriate sportspeople in the United States
Argentine Primera División players
Club Atlético Banfield footballers
Portland Timbers players
Olympic footballers of Argentina
Footballers at the 2020 Summer Olympics
Major League Soccer players
Sportspeople from Buenos Aires Province